This list of medicine awards is an index to articles about notable awards for contributions to medicine, the science and practice of establishing the diagnosis, prognosis, treatment, and prevention of disease. The list is organized by region and country of the organization giving the award, but the awards may be available to people from around the world.

International

Americas

Asia

Europe

United Kingdom

Oceania

See also

 Lists of awards
 Lists of science and technology awards
 List of biomedical science awards
 List of psychology awards
 Competitions and prizes in biotechnology

References

 
Medicine